Avalon High is a young adult novel by Meg Cabot, published in 2005.

Plot

Elaine " Ellie" Harrison has just moved to Annapolis, Maryland with her parents, who are medieval history professors. Her brother, Geoff, has just started his first year at university. She spends her summer talking to her best friend Nancy, and floating in her swimming pool. Her new school, Avalon High, seems like a typical high school with the stereotypical students: Lance Reynolds, the jock and halfback, Jennifer Gold, head cheerleader, and Will Wagner, the senior class president, quarterback and Ellie's crush. She takes an immediate disliking to Mr. Morton, the British teacher at her school, despite him being popular amongst students.
Unexpectedly, Will turns up at Ellie's house and ends up having dinner with her family. He grows closer to her and even gives her a rose one day from a lemonade stand.
Ellie befriends unpopular kids, the nerdy Liz and Stacy, who are fond of gossiping. They tell her that Will's father, Admiral Wagner, a naval instructor, married his best friend's widow and now Will is stepbrothers with Marco Campbell, a troubled teenager who was expelled from Avalon High. 
Will plays in a football game against a rival school and invites Ellie to his party afterwards.

Characters
Elaine "Ellie" Harrison: the new student at Avalon High—she moved to Annapolis, Maryland from Minnesota and is presumed to represent Elaine of Astolat for most of the novel, though it is revealed later that she plays a different role in the legend, the Lady of the Lake, Arthur's magical protector.
Arthur William "Will" Wagner Jr.: The son of Admiral Arthur William Wagner, Sr and is a star quarterback for the Avalon High School Fighting Knights, he represents King Arthur, as most people thought.
Jennifer Gold: a cheerleader and Will's girlfriend who corresponds to Queen Guinevere in the legend of Arthur.
Lance Reynolds: he Avalon High School football team's cornerback, who is Will's best friend. Lance corresponds to Lancelot.
Marco Campbell: Marco is Will's step-brother, revealed later to be his half brother. He represents Mordred. 
Mr. Morton: Avalon High School English teacher. He is a member of "The Order of the Bear" and represents Merlin.
Admiral Arthur William Wagner Sr.: He is Will's father and he corresponds to Uther Pendragon in the legend. He seemingly murders his best friend (by sending him into combat where he was killed) and then marries his wife.
Jean Wagner: Jean is Admiral Wagner's wife, who married him 6 months after her husband died in combat. Although originally it was believed that she was merely Will's stepmother, it was later revealed (by Mr. Morton) that she was in actuality Will's birth mother. She corresponds to Igraine in the legend.
Ellie's parents: professors of  medieval history on sabbatical. Her mother is writing a book on Elaine, the so-called "lily maid" of Astolat, and her father is writing his on the sword that Ellie takes to the park and hands to Will during his face-off with Marco, thus revealing herself as the Lady of the Lake. Ellie's parents care about her despite being an embarrassment at times.
Liz: a minor character and Ellie's first friend at Avalon High. Although unpopular, she loves to gossip and knows information about all the students at the school, especially Will.

Reception

Avalon High reached number 3 on The New York Times children's best sellers list in January 2006.

Film adaptation

Disney Channel adapted the book as a Disney Channel Original Movie of the same title in 2010, starring Britt Robertson, Gregg Sulkin, Joey Pollari, Devon Graye and Steve Valentine. The movie premiered November 12, 2010. Some parts of the movie are filmed in New Zealand.

The characters in the film are both renamed and have their mythic alter egos swapped, with respect to the book. In the film Allie (Ellie in the book), rather than Will, is King Arthur (but several characters initially believe otherwise); Mr. Moore  (Mr. Morton in the book) is in the film Mordred, replacing Marco; and Miles (instead of Moore/Morton) is Merlin. In the film, Marco reveals himself to be a member of the Order of the Bear, and determined to protect Will (believing him to be Arthur), although Allie initially believes Marco to be Mordred. In the film, Mr. Moore reveals that he suspected Allie to be the Lady of the Lake and is shocked that she is Arthur. The climactic battle scene, which in the book takes place in the ravine, in the film occurs in the school theater (which magically becomes a beach). The students are explained as the reincarnations of their alter egos, as opposed to merely corresponding to them. Allie is an only child; she no longer has a brother. Since Will is not Arthur, some connections are eliminated: Will's father is not trying to make Will join the navy; Will does not sail, nor does he have a dog (in the book there are connections to the names of Arthur's dog and boat). Avalon High's team name is the Knights, not Excalibur. Many potentially violent and threatening scenes were removed and scene settings changed to make the movie more appropriate for younger children.

Avalon High: Coronation

Three pseudo-manga volumes have been also released: Coronation Volume 1: The Merlin Prophecy, Coronation Volume 2: Homecoming, and Coronation Volume 3: Hunter's Moon.

References

 Meg Cabot, Avalon High, HarperCollins, December 27, 2005.

External links

 Avalon High at the Disney Channel

2005 American novels
Modern Arthurian fiction
Novels by Meg Cabot
American young adult novels
Novels set in high schools and secondary schools
American novels adapted into films
American novels adapted into television shows